The 5th Edward Jancarz Memorial was the 1997 version of the Edward Jancarz Memorial. It took place on 3 August in the Stal Gorzów Stadium in Gorzów Wielkopolski, Poland. The Memorial was won by Hans Nielsen who beat Tony Rickardsson and Sławomir Drabik.

Heat details 
 3 August 1997 (Sunday)
 Best Time: 63.49 - Tony Rickardsson in Heat 5
 Attendance:
 Referee: Lechosław Bartnicki

Heat after heat 
 (63.70) Nielsen, Jankowski, Karlsson, Krzyżaniak
 (63.66) Rickardsson, Wiltshire, Bajerski, Huszcza
 (63.77) Drabik, Świst, Andersen, Smith
 (63.72) Kasper, Paluch, Louis, Kowalik
 (63.49) Rickardsson, Andersen, Kowalik, Jankowski (F)
 (64.07) Bajerski, Drabik, Karlsson,
 (64.25) Krzyżaniak, Świst, Wiltshire, Paluch
 (64.01) Nielsen, Huszcza, Louis, Smith
 (64.81) Jankowski, Świst, Louis, Bajerski (R)
 (64.09) Rickardsson, Smith, Paluch, Karlsson
 (64.36) Kasper, Huszcza, Andersen, Krzyżaniak
 (63.86) Nielsen, Drabik, Staszewski, Wiltshire, Kowalik (T)
 (64.81) Wiltshire, Jankowski, Smith, Kasper
 (63.65) Karlsson, Świst, Huszcza, Kowalik
 (63.55) Rickardsson, Louis, Krzyżaniak, Drabik (F)
 (63.50) Nielsen, Andersen, Paluch, Cegielski, Bajerski (T)
 (65.05) Huszcza, Drabik, Jankowski, Paluch (F)
 (64.96) Andersen, Karlsson, Wiltshire, Louis (T)
 (64.02) Bajerski, Krzyżaniak, Smith, Staszewski, Kowalik (-)
 (63.51) Nielsen, Rickardsson, Świst, Kasper
 3rd-5th placed Run-Off
 (64.66) Drabik, Świst, Andersen

See also 
 motorcycle speedway
 1997 in sports

References

External links 
 (Polish) Stal Gorzów Wlkp. official webside

Memorial
Edward Jancarz Memorial
1997